The 1928 Spring Hill Badgers football team was an American football team that represented Spring Hill College, a Jesuit college in Mobile, Alabama, as member of the Southern Intercollegiate Athletic Association (SIAA) during the 1928 college football season. In its fourth season under head coach William T. Daly, the team compiled an overall record of 2–5–1 with a mark of 2–3–1 in SIAA play.

Schedule

References

Spring Hill
Spring Hill Badgers football seasons
Spring Hill Badgers football